First Sergeant Jacob Trautman (1840 – November 7, 1898) was a German-born soldier in the U.S. Army. His service included an enlistment with a Pennsylvania cavalry regiment during the Civil War and with the 7th Cavalry Regiment during the Indian Wars. He was one of twenty men who received the Medal of Honor for his actions at the Battle of Wounded Knee, now called the Wounded Knee Massacre, and afterward.

Biography
Jacob Trautman was born in Germany, in 1840 to Jacob and Margaret Trautman. He emigrated to the United States.

Trautman made a claim for a pension to the pensions office of the War Department based on service with Company E and Company L, Pennsylvania Cavalry and with Troop I, 7th Cavalry Regiment Trautman enlisted in the 5th Pennsylvania Cavalry as a private and was discharged as a sergeant. Trautman mustered into Company L, 5th Cavalry, Pennsylvania Volunteers on August 9, 1861; he was promoted to corporal and later to sergeant; and was transferred to Company E on June 5, 1865. In Company E, Trautman served as a sergeant and mustered out with the company on August 7, 1865; his individual record is annotated "Vet."

Trautman enlisted with I Troop, 7th Cavalry Regiment on January 4, 1876, in Pittsburgh, Pennsylvania. This enlistment was his second but there is no identification of the nature of his first term (Civil War or some service between 1865 and 1876). He was discharged on January 3, 1881, at Fort Totten, Dakota Territory as a first sergeant. Trautman re-enlisted immediately on January 4, 1881, at Fort Totten and served until January 3, 1886, when he was discharged at Fort Meade, Dakota Territory as a first sergeant.

Trautman next re-enlisted at Fort Totten on January 4, 1886. He was part of a force sent to arrest the Sioux chieftain Big Foot and disarm his 350 followers; he was among the cavalry troopers who, on the morning of December 29, 1890, surrounded his camp on the banks of Wounded Knee Creek. Trautman distinguished himself by killing an armed Sioux warrior "at close quarters", and was among the twenty cavalrymen who received the Medal of Honor. His term of service expired on January 3, 1891, at the Pine Ridge Agency, South Dakota. Although he was entitled to retire with pension, Troutman re-enlisted for the last time on January 4, 1891, while at the Pine Ridge Agency; he retired on August 3, 1891.

Later life and death
Trautman returned to Pittsburgh where he died at his home at 21 Carson Street on November 7, 1898, from a cerebral hemorrhage at the age of 58. He was buried at South Side Cemetery.

Medal of Honor citation

Killed a hostile Indian at close quarters, and, although entitled to retirement from service, remained to the close of the campaign.

See also
List of Medal of Honor recipients for the Indian Wars

References

External links
Army at Wounded Knee

1840 births
1898 deaths
Union Army soldiers
American military personnel of the Indian Wars
United States Army Medal of Honor recipients
Military personnel from Pittsburgh
United States Army soldiers
German-born Medal of Honor recipients
German emigrants to the United States
American Indian Wars recipients of the Medal of Honor
Pine Ridge Campaign
Military personnel from Hamburg